Ajjah is a Palestinian village in the Jenin Governorate in the northern West Bank, located 19 kilometers southwest of Jenin. According to the Palestinian Central Bureau of Statistics, the village had a population of 5,055 in 2007.

History
It has been suggested that this was Aak, or Aaj in the list of places conquered by Thutmose III.

Pottery sherds from Middle Bronze IIB, IA I, IA II, Persian, Hellenistic, early and late Roman, Byzantine and early Muslim eras have been found here.

In 1179 the village (named Casale Age) was mentioned together with Fahma in Crusader sources as being among the villages whose revenue were given to the Zion Abbey by Pope Alexander III.

Ottoman era
Ajjah, like the rest of Palestine, was incorporated into the Ottoman Empire in 1517, and in the census of 1596 it was a part of the nahiya ("subdistrict") of Jabal Sami which was under the administration of the liwa ("district") of Nablus. The village had a population of 13 households, all Muslim. The villagers paid a fixed tax-rate of 33,3% on agricultural products, such as wheat, barley, summer crops, olive trees, beehives and/or goats, in addition to occasional revenues, a tax for people of liwa Nablus, and a press for olive oil or grape syrup; a total of 3,612 akçe. Pottery sherds from the Ottoman era have also been found here.   En-Nabulsi (1641 – 1731), noted Ajjah as "a village on the road from Fahme and er-Rameh".

In 1830, the people of Ajjah fought against the army of Emir Bashir Shihab II during the siege of Sanur. In 1838, 'Ajjeh was noted as being in the District of esh-Sha'rawiyeh esh-Shurkiyeh, the eastern part.

In 1870, Victor Guérin noted it as a village on a hill, covering its summit, with 500 inhabitants, surrounded by olive groves.

In 1882, the PEF's Survey of Western Palestine described Ajjeh as: "A village of small size, but of ancient appearance, perched on the edge of a hill, and built of stone, with olive groves below. It has a cistern on the south-east."

British mandate era 
In the 1922 census of Palestine, conducted by the British Mandate authorities, the village had a population of 500 Muslims, increasing in the 1931 census to 643 Muslims, in 142 houses.

In the 1944/5 statistics the population of Ajja was 890 Muslims, with a total of 11,027 dunams of land, according to an official land and population survey. Of this, 737 dunams were used for plantations and irrigable land, 5,605 dunams for cereals, while 23 dunams were built-up (urban) land.

Jordanian era
In the wake of the 1948 Arab–Israeli War, and after the 1949 Armistice Agreements, Ajjah came under Jordanian rule. 

The Jordanian census of 1961 found 1,190 inhabitants.

Post-1967
Since the 1967 Six-Day War, Ajjah has been under Israeli occupation. In 1978, the Medieval fortress still crowned the summit of the village, and around it were buildings from the 16th and 17th CE, and two mosques.

References

Bibliography

External links
 Welcome to Ajja
Aja Welcome to Palestine
Survey of Western Palestine, Map 11: IAA, Wikimedia commons 

Jenin Governorate
Villages in the West Bank
Municipalities of the State of Palestine